Madhu Rye is a Gujarati playwright, novelist and story writer. Born in Gujarat and educated at Calcutta, he started writing in the 1960s and became known for his stories and plays. His experience at the University of Hawaii introduced him to experimental writing and improvisations as writing aid, which later led to a movement against absurd theatre. He moved to the US in 1974 and has lived there since. He chiefly wrote novels, short stories and plays. His plays were successful and have been adapted into several languages and media. He has adapted his novels into plays and some plays into novels. The most notable is Kimball Ravenswood, which was loosely adapted into a Hindi TV series Mr. Yogi (1989), and a Hindi film, What's Your Rashee? (2009).

Early life and education
Madhusudan Vallabhdas Thaker was born in  1942 in Jamkhambhaliya, Gujarat to Vallabhdas and Vijayaben. He completed his primary and secondary education in Calcutta. He studied Intermediate Science at Scottish Church College in Calcutta from 1958 to 1960. He did his Bachelor of Arts from University of Calcutta in 1963. He started out by translating the short stories of Gujarati writer Shivkumar Joshi, in Hindi, under the pen name Madhu Rye.

Career
Rye was encouraged by Shivkumar Joshi and Chandrakant Bakshi to write his own short stories. He taught for a brief period and worked in a machinery concern for few years. He wrote his first short story for a contest under the pen name "Madhu Rye" and won second prize. He moved to Ahmedabad in 1967 and joined Navneetlal and Co. as a marketing writer.

His play Koi Pan Ek Phool Nu Naam Bolo To (Tell Me the Name of a Flower) premiered in 1969, directed by Mrinalini Sarabhai and produced by Darpana Academy. He went to Honolulu, US in 1970 and studied stagecraft, especially playwriting and direction at the University of Hawaii for two semesters.

After returning in 1971, he founded Aakanth Sabarmati, a playwrights' workshop to preach minimalist style and the importance of improvisation in plays, against the prevalent absurd theatre.

In 1974, he married Suvarna Bhatt. In 1974, he, along with his wife, moved to the US to study for a MA in continuing education with special emphasis on creative writing at the University of Evansville, Evansville, Indiana. He later separated from her.

Rye settled in the US and started the Gujarati weekly in 1978. He also edited Gujarat Times, published from New York City. He now lives in New Jersey, and has edited the Gujarati short story magazine Mamata since 2011.

Works
Rye is an experimental and modernist writer. He created the style of formless prose writing called "harmonica" for some of his short stories. He chiefly wrote fiction and plays. He adapted his novels into plays and vice versa. His plays were adapted into several languages including Hindi, Marathi and English. His short stories and plays became very popular in 1960s.

Short stories
Banshi Naamni Ek Chhokri (1964) was his first short story collection with experimental modern styles. Roopkatha (1972) is a collection of twenty-eight stories in traditional as well as "harmonica" style. His other work Kaalsarp (1972) has humour and imagination. Kautuk (2005) is his short story collection.

Novels
Chehra (1966) is his experimental novel.  Kimball Ravenswood (1973) is a story of a non-resident Indian searching for a bride in India, intertwined with mock astrology. Kalpataru (1987) is a futuristic mystery science fiction novel. He also adapted three novels from his own plays; Kamini (1970) from Koi Pan Ek Phool Nu Naam Bolo To (1968), Sabha (1972) from Kumarni Agashi (1975), Saapbaji from Aapne Club ma Malya Hata. They all are psychological thrillers. Mukhsukh (2001) and Sura, Sura, Sura are his other novels.

His novel Kimball Ravenswood was adapted into plays in several languages including The Suitable Bride in English and Yogesh Patelnu Vevishal in Gujarati. It was also adapted into a TV series entitled Mr. Yogi (1989), and as the film What's Your Rashee? (2009).

Plays
Koi Pan Ek Phool Nu Naam Bolo To (Tell Me the Name of a Flower, 1968), Kumar ni Agashi (The Terrace, 1975) and Aapne Club ma Malya Hata, Pankor Nake Jaake, Sura Ane Shatrujeet are his plays. Koipan Ek Phoolnu Naam Bolo To was translated into fourteen languages, and broadcast by the All India Radio and adapted as a telefilm by Ketan Mehta for Doordarshan. It was a meta-theatrical murder mystery. Yogesh Patelnu Vevishal is an adaptation of his novel Kimball Ravenswood. His later plays were performed by the Indian National Theatre, directed by Pravin Joshi. His play Kumar Ni Agashi created a sensation in the field of Gujarati theatre. It was about repressed sexuality in upper middle class society.

Ashwatthama (1973), Aapnu Evun (2005) and Kanta Kahe are collections of one-act plays including some absurd plays. Aakanth (1974) is a collection of selected twenty-three plays with novel ideas from more than fifty plays by various writers which were written during the activities of Aakanth Sabarmati. Mrs Moorthy was his first English language play. His one act play Ashwatthama was once a popular entry in college competitions along with his other one act plays. His play Sura ane Shatrujeet is sporadically performed by amateur groups in Gujarat and Mumbai.

He has also adapted various plays into Gujarati including: George Bernard Shaw's Pygmalion and its musical adaptation My Fair Lady as a musical Santu Rangilee (1976), Friedrich Dürrenmatt's The Visit as Sharat and Anthony Shaffer's Sleuth as Khelando. These all adaptations earned him wide acclaim. His Gujarati adaptation of Dale Wasserman's play One Flew Over the Cuckoo's Nest (based on Ken Kesey's 1962 novel of the same name) was mildly successful.

Essays
Rye has been an avid writer of essays, published as weekly columns in several publications, such as Navroz, Janmabhoomi, Samkaleen, and Abhiyaan. He writes a weekly column Neele Gagan Ke Tale (Under the Big Blue Sky) in Gujarati daily Divya Bhaskar since 2008.

His essay collections are Neele Gagan Ke Tale, Mann Ki Been, Sepia, Dil Ki Gali, Kefiyat.

Translation 
He translated three works into Gujarati; The Scarlet Letter, Heaven Knows, Mr. Allison and The Light in the Forest. Kahan is his translation of a work by Mrinalini Sarabhai.

Awards
He was awarded Narmad Suvarna Chandrak in 1972. He received the Ranjitram Suvarna Chandrak for 1999. He received the Bhupen Khakhar Award in 2004 for his play, Sura Ane Shatrujeet. He also received the Sahitya Gaurav puraskar award in 2020

See also
List of Gujarati-language writers

References

External links
 
An interview with Madhu Rye at the EBC Drama Club with Sudipta Bhawmik and Kulraaj Anand (6 October 2013) on archive.org

1942 births
Living people
Novelists from Gujarat
Gujarati-language writers
Indian male novelists
Indian male dramatists and playwrights
Scottish Church College alumni
University of Calcutta alumni
People from Devbhoomi Dwarka district
University of Evansville alumni
20th-century Indian dramatists and playwrights
20th-century Indian novelists
20th-century Indian translators
American people of Gujarati descent
20th-century Indian essayists
Recipients of the Ranjitram Suvarna Chandrak
Dramatists and playwrights from Gujarat
20th-century Indian male writers
Writers from New Jersey